Basilissa or Vasilissa (Greek :Βασίλισσα) is  a female first name, derived from the title Basilissa.

The name may refer to:
Basilissa of Saints Basilissa and Anastasia  (died 68 AD), Christian martyr
Basilissa of Saints Callinica and Basilissa (died 252 AD), Christian martyr
Basilissa of Saints Julian and Basilissa  (died c. 304 AD), Christian martyr 
Basilla of Rome (died 257 AD), Christian martyr
Vasilissa (child martyr), early 4th century
A spelling variant of Vasilisa (name)

See also
Basilinna